The Curtiss XO-30 was a projected 1920s American twin-engined observation monoplane designed by the Curtiss Aeroplane and Motor Company for the United States Army Air Service, a prototype was cancelled and not built.

Design and development
One prototype observation monoplane was ordered by the United States Army Air Service and designated XO-30 with the serial number 29-451. The XO-30 was to have had two  V-1570-9 engines and a crew of three. The program was cancelled and the prototype was not built.

References

Notes

Bibliography

 

O-030
Cancelled military aircraft projects of the United States
Monoplanes
Twin piston-engined tractor aircraft